Acromantis moultoni, common name Borneo acromantis, is a species of praying mantis native to Borneo.

See also
List of mantis genera and species

References

Moultoni
Mantodea of Southeast Asia
Endemic fauna of Borneo
Insects of Borneo
Insects of Indonesia
Insects of Malaysia
Insects described in 1915